Michel-Antoine David also David l'aîné (1707, ? – 17 March 1769, Paris) was an 18th-century French printer, publisher and Encyclopédiste during the Age of Enlightenment. He was one of the four printers of the Encyclopédie.

Biography 
David came from a family of Parisian printers; he was the son of Michel Etienne David. His grandfather was the printer Michel David and his uncle David Christophe (1682–1741). He trained from September 1727 until January 1732 by the Parisian printer Claude-Louis Thiboust. On 2 May 1732, he became a member of the guild of booksellers and printers of Paris and on 1 September 1733 he received his master's certificate.

David was one of the four publishers of the Encyclopédie whose editors were Denis Diderot and Jean le Rond d'Alembert. The other publishers were André le Breton, Antoine-Claude Briasson, and Laurent Durand.

He himself wrote two articles for the Encyclopédie: Catalogue and Droit de copie (see wikisource infra)

Bibliography 
 Augustin-Martin Lottin: Catalogue chronologique des libraires et des libraires-imprimeurs de Paris depuis l'an 1470... jusqu'à présent. Paris, 1789, 2 vol.
 Marie-Anne Merland; Jehanne Reyniers: La Fortune d'André-François Lebreton.  In  Revue française d'histoire du livre. Jan.-März 1979
 Jean-Dominique Mellot; Élisabeth Queval: Répertoire d'imprimeurs/libraires (vers 1500-vers 1810). Paris, Bibliothèque nationale de France, 2004, (p. 170).
 Robert Darnton: The Business of Enlightenment: Publishing History of the Encyclopédie 1775-1800. Harvard University Press 1987, 
 Blom, Philipp: Das vernünftige Ungeheuer. Diderot, D'Alembert, De Jaucourt und die Grosse Enzyklopädie. Eichborn Verlag Frankfurt a/M. 2005, (p. 78), 131

References

External links 
 
 Michel-Antoine David on Wikisource
 Miche-Antoine David on data.bnf.fr

Contributors to the Encyclopédie (1751–1772)
Printers from Paris
Publishers (people) from Paris
Denis Diderot
1707 births
1769 deaths